The 2005 İstanbul Cup was a tennis tournament played on outdoor clay courts. It was the first edition of the İstanbul Cup, and was part of the WTA Tier III tournaments of the 2005 WTA Tour. It was held in İstanbul from 16 through 21 May 2005.

Points and prize money

Point distribution

Prize money

* per team

Singles main-draw entrants

Seeds

Other entrants
The following players received wildcards into the singles main draw:
  Çağla Büyükakçay
  Pemra Özgen

The following players received entry from the qualifying draw:
  Ivana Abramović  
  Tsvetana Pironkova
  Lina Stančiūtė
  Elena Vesnina

The following players received entry as lucky losers:
  Katerina Bondarenko

Doubles main-draw entrants

Seeds

Other entrants
The following pairs received wildcards into the doubles main draw:
  Anna Chakvetadze /  Pemra Özgen

Finals

Singles

 Venus Williams defeated  Nicole Vaidišová, 6–3, 6–2

Doubles

 Marta Marrero /  Antonella Serra Zanetti defeated  Daniela Klemenschits /  Sandra Klemenschits, 6–4, 6–0

References

External links
 ITF tournament edition details
 WTA tournament draws

İstanbul Cup
İstanbul Cup
2005 in Turkish tennis
May 2005 sports events in Turkey